Buluthan Bulut (born 21 July 2002) is a Turkish professional footballer who plays as a midfielder for TFF Third League club Alanya Kestelspor on loan from Alanyaspor.

Professional career
A youth product of Bağlarbaşıspor, Altınordu, Göztepe, and Alanyaspor, Bulut signed his first professional contract with Alanyaspor. He joined Alanya Kestelspor on loan for the 2020–21 season in the TFF Third League. He made his professional debut for Alanyaspor in a 4–1 Süper Lig loss to Altay on 21 August 2021.

References

External links
 

2002 births
Living people
People from Bursa
Turkish footballers
Association football midfielders
Turkey youth international footballers
Alanyaspor footballers
Süper Lig players
TFF Third League players